Live at Maxwell's is the first live album by indie rock band Imperial Teen.  The album was recorded on July 31, 2002 at Maxwell's in Hoboken, New Jersey.  It was released between their third studio record On (2002), and their fourth studio record The Hair the TV the Baby and the Band (2007), and was released in the U.S. on October 22, 2002 from DCN Records.

Track listing
"The Beginning" - 2:38
"Ivanka" - 3:19
"Our Time" - 2:23
"Butch" - 4:28
"Sugar" - 3;32
"Yoo-Hoo" - 4:01
"Baby" - 3:00
"City Song" - 2:34
"Lipstick" - 5:26
"Birthday Girl" - 3:56
"Teacher's Pet" - 3:25
"You're One" - 3:38
"Balloon" - 4:02

References

Imperial Teen albums
2002 live albums